The annular stapedial ligament (also called the stapediovestibular joint) is a ring of fibrous soft tissue that connects the base of the stapes to the oval window of the inner ear.

Calcification and hardening of the annular ligament of the stapes (Otosclerosis) is a common cause of adult deafness.

Ear
Ligaments